Libralces was a genus of Eurasian deer that lived during the Pliocene epoch. Its main claim to fame are its 2+ meter wide antlers, comparable in size to those of Megaloceros.

Libralces fossils have been found from France to Tajikistan, with the best-known examples being the French L. gallicus.

According to Jordi Agustí, Libralces was the ancestor of Megaloceros, though most other authorities regard it as a relative of moose, Alces.

In the Pleistocene, there were three genera of Holarctic moose-like deer — Cervalces, Alces, and Libralces.  In contrast to modern Alces, the Villafranchian Libralces gallicus had very long-beamed, small-palmed antlers and a generalized skull with moderately reduced nasals; the Nearctic Cervalces had longer nasals and more complex antlers than Libralces.
Azzaroli 1953 added Alces latiforns to Libralces, but this position has been challenged. L. latifrons is now considered a synonym of Cervalces latifrons.

Gallery

References 

Capreolinae
Prehistoric deer
Pliocene even-toed ungulates
Pliocene mammals of Asia
Pliocene mammals of Europe
Pliocene extinctions
Prehistoric even-toed ungulate genera
Fossil taxa described in 1952